Nobody's Angel was an American girl group of the late 1990s and early 2000s. The group consisted of four members Alitzah Navarro, Stacey Harper, Amy Sue Hardy and Sarah Smith and later, Jennie Kwan and Tai-Amber Hoo as replacements when Harper and Hardy left the group. The band was put together after they became friends and discovered they had something in common: a shared taste for music, dancing and acting.

Biography
In 1998, the quartet recorded "Let's Get Together" for the movie The Parent Trap. A year later, the girls all guest-starred as fictionalized versions of themselves on the episode "Road Trip" from the ABC sitcom Boy Meets World, and soon after, in 2000, they released their self-titled album, on the Hollywood Records label. Nobody's Angel featured the hit song, "If You Wanna Dance". Later, they released the song "Pokémon World" with the boy band Youngstown for the movie Pokémon The Movie 2000.

They were featured on the ABC TV movie, Model Behavior, starring Justin Timberlake. Stacey and Amy Sue both left the group in 2001 to pursue careers of their own. They were soon replaced by actress-singer Jennie Kwan (formerly of the NBC show California Dreams) and Tai-Amber Hoo. Tai-Amber was a former member of another girl group called Gyrl before she joined Nobody's Angel. However, the group disbanded after the debut single was released.

After recording a few songs for the soundtracks to the Disney live-action films 102 Dalmatians (2000) and The Princess Diaries (2001), the group split up. An album was due to be released in 2002, but was shelved. The album did feature the singles "Whatcha Gonna Do (With Your Second Chance)?", "Always Tomorrow", and a remake of the Salt-N-Pepa song "Ain't Nuthin' But a She Thing" featuring Lil' J. Besides the songs from the soundtracks no new music from their second album has been leaked.

In January 2020, an official Instagram page for the group was opened, with speculations that the band is planning a possible comeback.

In 2020, Sarah Christine Smith appeared as a guest on the Studio 60 on the Sunset Strip marathon fundraiser episode of The George Lucas Talk Show.

Discography 
Studio albums
Nobody's Angel (February 1, 2000)
Singles
 "If You Wanna Dance" (November 23, 1999)
 "I Can't Help Myself" (2000) (Promo)
Soundtracks
The Parent Trap Soundtrack – "Let's Get Together" (July 21, 1998)
Pokémon The Movie 2000 Soundtrack – "Pokémon World" featuring Youngstown (July 18, 2000)
102 Dalmatians Soundtrack – "Whatcha Gonna Do (With Your Second Chance)?" (October 30, 2000)
The Princess Diaries Soundtrack – "Ain't Nuthin' But a She Thing" featuring Lil' J and "Always Tomorrow" (July 24, 2001)

References

External links 
 Nobody's Angel Official on Instagram
 Nobody's Angel on Discogs
 Nobody's Angel on allmusic
 Alitzah Navarro on IMDb
 Stacey Harper on IMDb

Musical groups established in 1998
American pop girl groups
American pop music groups
Musical groups from Los Angeles
Hollywood Records artists
Musical quartets
Musical groups disestablished in 2002